This incomplete list of rivers that flow through China is organized according to the body of water into which each river empties, beginning with the Sea of Okhotsk in the northeast, moving clockwise on a map and ending with the Arctic Ocean.

Sea of Okhotsk

 Heilong River (黑龙江) (Amur River)
Ussuri River (乌苏里江)
Muling River (穆棱河)
 Songacha River (松阿察河)
 Songhua River (松花江)
Ashi River (阿什河)
 Hulan River (呼兰河)
 Second Songhua River(第二松花江)
 Woken River (倭肯河)
 Mudan River (牡丹江)
 Nen River (嫩江)
Gan River (Inner Mongolia) (甘河)
Huifa River (辉发河)
 Argun (额尔古纳河) 
Hailar River (海拉尔河)
Hulun Lake(呼伦湖)
Kherlen River (克鲁伦河)
Buir Lake(贝尔湖)(mostly in Mongolia)

Sea of Japan
 Suifen River (绥芬河) / Razdolnaya River (Russia)
 Tumen River (图们江)
 Hunchun River (珲春河)

Bohai Sea
Anzi River (鞍子河)
Fuzhou River (复州河)
Daliao River (大辽河)

 Liao (辽河)
Taizi River (太子河)
 Hun River (浑河)
 Liu River (柳河)
Dongliao River(东辽河)
Xiliao River (西辽河)
 Xar Moron River (西拉木伦河)
 Daling River (大凌河)
 Yantai River (烟台河)
 Liugu River (六股河)
 Shi River (石河)
 Gou River (狗河)
 Dashi River (大石河)
 Jiujiang River (九江河)
 Dai River (戴河)
 Yang River (洋河)
 Luan (滦河)
 Hai (海河)
Chaobai River(潮白河)
Chao River
Bai River

 Wei (潍河)
 Zhang (漳河)
 Yongding (永定河)
 Sanggan River (桑干河)
 Yang He (洋河) 
 Daqing River (大清河)
Juma River (拒马河)
 Wei (卫河)
Tuhai River

 Yellow River (Huang He) (黃河)
Yufu River(玉符河)
Beidasha River(北大沙河)
Nandasha River(南大沙河)
Dawen River(大汶河)
Liuchang River(柳长河 or 流长河)
Yuejin River(跃进河)
Hui River(汇河)
Jinxian River(金线河)
Kangwang River(康王河)
Wu River(五河)
Beiquan River(北泉河)
Cao River(漕河)
Miaojia River(苗家河)
Chaiwen River(柴汶河)
Yucun River(禹村河)
Guangming River(光明河)
Yangliu River(羊流河)
Xizhou River(西周河)
Pingyang River(平阳河)
Weishui River(渭水河)
Panwen River(泮汶河)
Zhitian River(芝田河)
Tao River(陶河)
Yingwen River(瀛汶河)
Shiwen River(石汶河)
Fangxia River(方下河)
Lianhua River(莲花河)
Lixin River(里辛河)
Jindi River(金堤河)
Huangzhuang River(黄庄河)
Luo River (Henan) (洛河(南))
Yi River(伊河)
 Qin River (沁河)
Wei (渭河)
 Jing (泾河)
 Luo River (Shaanxi) (洛河(北))
Fen (汾河)
Yan River (延河)
Wuding River (无定河/無定河)
Kuye River (窟野河)
Dahei River (大黑河)
Qingshui River (清水河)
Zuli River (祖厉河/祖厲河)
Tao River (洮河)
Daxia River (大夏河)
Star River (湟水)
White River (白河)
 Xiaoqing (小清河, formerly known as 济河)
 Zihe River (淄河)
 (Xin)Tahe River
 Yanghe River (阳河)
 Zhangseng River
Mihe River

Yellow Sea

 Yalu (鸭绿江) - Korea Bay
 Dayang River (大洋河) - Korea Bay
 Huli River (湖里河) - Korea Bay
 Yingna River (英那河) - Korea Bay
 Zhuang River (庄河) - Korea Bay
 Xiaosi River (小寺河) - Korea Bay
 Jiao (胶河)
 Yishui River (沂河)
 Shu (沭河)
 Si (泗河)

 Northern Jiangsu Irrigation Channel
Hongze Lake(洪泽湖)
Huai (淮河)
Hui River (浍河)
Guo River (涡河)
 Ying River (颍河) - also known as Shaying River (沙颖)
Xiaorun River (小润河)
Gu River (谷河)
Shiguan (史灌河)
Guan River (灌河)
Hong River (洪河)
Huang River (潢河)
Lü River (闾河)
Ming River (明河)
You River (游河)
Yue River, Shaanxi

East China Sea

 Yangtze River (Chang Jiang 长江; upper reach known as Jinsha Jiang 金沙江 and  Tongtian River 通天河)
Huangpu River (黃浦江)
Suzhou Creek or Wusong River (苏州河, 吴淞江)
Xitiao River (西苕溪)
Daxi Creek 
 Grand Canal (大运河)
 Qinhuai River
Gaoyou Lake (高邮湖)
Sanhe River (三河)
Hongze Lake
Huai River
Guxi River (姑溪河)
Shijiu Lake (石臼湖) 
Yuxi River (裕溪河)
Lake Chao
Nanfei River(南淝河)
Qingyi River (青弋江)
Jingshan River (荆山河)
Daoni River (倒逆河)
Zhaxi River (渣溪河)
Machuan River (麻川河)
Taiping Lake (太平湖)
Sanxikou River (三溪口)
Qingxi River (清溪河)
Shuxi River (舒溪河)
 Poyang Lake
 Gan River (Jiangxi) (赣江)
 Zhang (章江)
 Gongshui (貢水)
 Mei (梅河)
 Xiang (湘水)
 Fuhe (抚河)
 Xin (信江)
 Fushui (富水)
 She River (灄水)
 Han River  (汉江 or 汉水)
 Chi (池水)
 Muma (牧马河)
 Du River
Lake Dongting
Miluo River (汨罗江)
 Xiang (湘江)
 Xiaoshui (瀟水)
 Zhengshui (氶水)
Zijiang (Zi) (资江)
Yuanjiang (Yuan) (沅江)
Lishui (Li) (澧水)
Loushui River (溇水)
Qing River (清江)
Huangbo River (黄柏河)
Shennong Stream (神农溪)
Daning River(大宁河)
 Modao Creek (磨刀溪)
 Jialing (嘉陵江)
 Fujiang (涪江)
 Qujiang (渠江)
 Baishui (白水)
 Bailong (白龙江)
 Liuchong River (Jialing)
 Longxi River (龙溪河)
 Huaxi River (花溪河)
 Qi River (綦江)
 Sunxi River (笋溪河)
Wu River (Yangtze River tributary) (乌江)
Sancha River
Liuchong River
Qingshuihe River
 Tuo River (沱江)
 Chishui River (赤水河)
 Min (Sichuan) (岷江)
 Dadu River (Sichuan) (大渡河)
Qingyi Jiang (青衣江)
Nanya River
 Caopo River
 Yalong River
 Muli River
 Pudu River
 Shuoduogang River (硕多岗河)
 Qiantang River (钱塘江) / Xin'an River (新安江)
Heng River (横江)
Longchuan River (龙川)
Fengxi River (丰溪河)
 Cao'e River (曹娥江)
 Yong River (甬江)
 Jiao River (椒江)
 Ou River (Zhejiang) (瓯江)
 Mulan River (木蘭溪畔)
Xikou River
Dajixi River
 Ao River (敖江)

Taiwan Strait
 Min (Fujian) (闽江)
 Long (Fujian) (龙江)
 Quanzhou Bay:
 Luo River (Fujian) (洛江)
 Jin River (Fujian) (晋江)
 Jiulong River (九龙江)

South China Sea

 Han (韩江)
Mei (梅江)
 Ning (宁江)
Ting (汀江)
Dajing (大靖河)
 Pearl River (Zhu Jiang) (珠江)
 Dongjiang (Dong) (东江)
 Liuxihe River
 Beijiang (Bei) (北江)
 Xinfeng River
 Xijiang (Xi) (西江)
 Guijiang (Gui) (桂江)
 Lijiang (Li) (漓江)
 Xunjiang (Xun) (浔江)
 Qian (黔江)
Liu River (柳江)
Rong River (融江
Long River (Guangxi)龙江)
Hongshui (Red River) (红水河)
Beipan (北盘江)
Nanpan (南盘江)
Qu River (曲江)
Lian River (Qu River) (练江)
 Yujiang (Yu) (鬱江)
 Yongjiang (Yong) (邕江)
 Zuojiang (Zuo) (左江)
Youjiang (You) (右江)
Beilun River (北仑河)
 Yuan River (元江) / (Red River)
Nanwen River (南温河) / Lô River
Lixian River (李仙江) / (Black River)
Three Parallel Rivers of Yunnan Protected Areas
Lancang River (澜沧江) (Mekong)
Nanju River (南桔河)
Nanla River (南腊河)
Luosuo River (罗梭江)

From Hainan Island

 Nandu River(南渡江)
Haidian River
 Wanquan River(万泉河)

Andaman Sea

 Nu River (怒江) / (Salween River)
 Wanma River (万马河)
 Hongyang River (硔养河)
 Mengboluo River (勐波罗河)
 Supa River (苏帕河)
 Shidian River (施甸河)
 Luomingba River (罗明坝河)
 Irrawaddy River (Myanmar)
Daying River (大盈江) / (Taping River)
Longchuan River (龙川江) / (Shweli River)
N'Mai River (Myanmar)
Dulong River (独龙江)

Bay of Bengal

 Ganges River (India) / Padma River (Bangladesh)
 Meghna River (Bangladesh)
 Yarlung Tsangpo River ( ཡར་ཀླུངས་གཙང་པོ་, 雅鲁藏布江)
Subansiri River(西巴霞曲)
Lhasa River
Parlung Tsangpo (帕隆藏布)
Yigong Tsangpo(易贡藏布)
Zayuqu (察隅曲) / Lohit River
Nyang River ( ཉང་ཆུ, 尼洋曲)
Manas River (Bhutan / India)
Lhobrak Chhu / Kuri Chhu
Kosi River (Nepal / India)
Bum Chu (བུམ་ཆུ, 澎曲 / 阿龙河) / Arun River
Matsang Tsangpo (མ་གཙང་གཙང་པོ།, 麻章藏布) / Bhotekoshi River
Rongshar Tsangpo (波特科西) / Tamakoshi River
Ghaghara River (格尔纳利河)

 Arabian Sea 
 Sênggê Zangbo (སེང་གེ།་གཙང་པོ, 狮泉河) / Indus RiverPanjnad River (Pakistan)Langqên Zangbo (གླང་ཆེན་གཙང་པོ, 象泉河) / Sutlej River

Arctic OceanOb River (Russia) Irtysh (额尔齐斯河)
 Bieliezeke River (别列则克河)
 Haba River (哈巴河)
Burqin River (布尔津河)
Kanas River
Kanas Lake
Hemu River
 Kala Irtysh River (喀拉额尔齐斯河)

Endorheic basins

 Dzungarian Basin 
 Ulungur Lake (乌伦古湖)
 Ulungur River (乌伦古河) 
 Manas Lake (玛纳斯湖)
 Manas River (玛纳斯河)
 Ailik Lake (艾里克湖)
 Baiyang River (白杨河)

 Ili Basin 

 Lake Balkhash (Kazakhstan) Ili river
 Kax River (喀什河; also known as the Kash River)
 Tekes River (特克斯河)

 Juyan Lake Basin 
Ejin River

 Lake Alakol 
 Lake Alakol (Kazakhstan) Emil (Emin) River
 Lake Zhalanashkol (Kazakhstan)''
 Terekty (Tielieketi) River

Qaidam Basin 

 Golmud River

Tarim Basin 

Qiemo River
Kaidu River
 Tarim River - ends in the Lop Lake
 Muzat River
Khotan River
 Karakash (Black Jade River) (黑玉江)
 Yurungkash (White Jade River) (白玉江)
Aksu River
Toshkan River
Yarkand River
Kashgar River
Tashkurgan River
Shaksgam River
Shule River
Dang River
Lucao River
Yulin River
Changma River
Karatash River

Canals
Grand Canal of China (大运河)
Lingqu Canal (灵渠), between the basins of the Pearl River and the Yangtze
Irtysh–Karamay–Ürümqi Canal (irrigation only)

See also
 Geography of China
 List of rivers of Asia
 Lakes in China
 List of waterways in China

References

External links 

  Interactive map with China's river basins, showing river names in Chinese.
 Table of rivers in China with Chinese names and useful data (dead link 01:15, 4 March 2013 (UTC))

China
Rivers